The statistical regions of Serbia are regulated by the Law of the Regional Development and the Law of the Official Statistics. Serbia is divided into five statistical regions which are chiefly used for statistical purposes, such as census data. The regions encompass one or multiple districts each.

Introduction 
In 2009, National Assembly of Serbia adopted the Law on Equal Territorial Development that formed seven statistical regions in the territory of Serbia. The Law was amended on 7 April 2010, so that the number of regions was reduced to five. The previously formed region of Eastern Serbia was merged with Southern Serbia and the region of Šumadija was merged with Western Serbia.

The five statistical regions of Serbia are:
 Vojvodina 
 Belgrade
 Šumadija and Western Serbia
 Southern and Eastern Serbia
 Kosovo and Metohija

Statistical regional classification
In a bylaw from 2010, the Government of Serbia specified a nomenclature of statistic territorial units in the country. The act was an attempt to synchronize the existing statistical division of the country with the Nomenclature of Territorial Units for Statistics of the European Union. According to the act, an additional top level of grouping was introduced, with the territory of Serbia divided into two NUTS 1 regions:
Serbia-North, comprising
Vojvodina
Belgrade, and
Serbia-South, comprising
Šumadija and Western Serbia
Southern and Eastern Serbia
Kosovo and Metohija

The five statistical regions would therefore become NUTS level 2 regions, while the Districts of Serbia would correspond with NUTS level 3. However, the classification has remained largely in internal, and limited, use within Serbia. , it has not been sanctioned by the European Union. According to a 2011 whitepaper by ESPON, which discusses the possibility to include Albania, Serbia, Montenegro and Bosnia and Herzegovina into NUTS nomenclature, "the statistical NUTS1 and NUTS2 regions created by the government in order to meet the NUTS criteria as well as the requirements of the EU regional policy, do not have actually a considerable administrative power; also, they are not self-governed entities. The political criterion prevailed for their creation."

Officially, NUTS regions only exist for EU Member States. For EFTA, EU candidate and potential candidate countries, the European Commission agrees with the countries concerned on a nomenclature referred to as "Statistical regions".

See also
Administrative divisions of Serbia
List of Serbian regions by Human Development Index

References

External links

 
Subdivisions of Serbia